Bostick is a surname, a variation of the English surname Bostock. It may refer to:

Akeem Bostick (born 1995), American minor league baseball player
Brandon Bostick (born 1989), American National Football League player
Chris Bostick (born 1993), American minor league baseball player
Devon Bostick (born 1991), Canadian actor
Francis Bostick, American engineer and professor emeritus
Henry Bostick (1895–1968), American Major League Baseball player born Henry Lipschitz
Sion Record Bostick (1819–1902), veteran of the Texas Revolution
Th-resa Bostick (born 1969), IFBB professional bodybuilder
Thomas P. Bostick (born 1956), American retired lieutenant general, former Chief of Engineers of the US Army and commanding general of the US Army Corps of Engineers
Winston H. Bostick (1916–1991), American physicist

See also
 Bostock

References

English-language surnames
Lists of people by surname